Stauffacher is a  tram junction (lines 2, 3, 8, 9, 14) in Aussersihl, Zurich, next to the St. Jakob church, situated along the Badenerstrasse between the Bäcker and the Stauffacher streets.
The tram stop was named after the street, which had been named for Werner Stauffacher in 1893.  Stauffacher is officially just the name of the tram stop, not the square, and there was formerly a Stauffacherplatz some 200 m farther along the street towards the Sihl (named in 1898). Since the name of the tram stop induced common usage to associate Stauffacherplatz with the tram stop, leading to confusion with the actual Stauffacherplatz, the latter was renamed to Ernst-Nobs-Platz in 2003.

St. Jakob was the site of a sick-house outside the town of Zurich and an associated chapel since the 11th century. The first historical mention of the St. Jakob church dates to 1221. It was the site of the Battle of St. Jakob an der Sihl in 1443. In 1677, the sick-house was transformed into a Pfrundhaus (senior citizens' residence), disestablished in 1842. The current St. Jakob church building was inaugurated in 1901.

External links
http://www.offener-st-jakob.ch/

Squares in Zürich